Cleveland v. United States is the name for two United States Supreme Court cases.

Cleveland v. United States (1946), 329 U.S. 14, about polygamy
Cleveland v. United States (2000), 531 U.S. 12, about mail fraud